Robert B. Kennedy (February 6, 1940 – May 1, 2018) was an American politician from Lowell, Massachusetts.

Early life
Kennedy was born in Lowell, Massachusetts. He attended Bentley College of Accounting and Finance and Lowell Technological Institute.

Politics
From 1971 to 1975, Kennedy was a member of the Lowell City Council. In 1972 he ran for the United States House of Representatives in Massachusetts's 5th congressional district. He finished fifth in a ten candidate Democratic primary with 7.47%.

From 1975 to 1979, Kennedy was a member of the Massachusetts House of Representatives.

Kennedy served on the Lowell City Council again from 1981 to 1990. From 1986 to 1987 he also served as Lowell's mayor.

From 1989 to 1995, Kennedy represented the 3rd District on the Massachusetts Governor's Council.

Death
He died on May 1, 2018 in Lowell, Massachusetts at the age of 78.

References

1940 births
2018 deaths
Mayors of Lowell, Massachusetts
Lowell, Massachusetts City Council members
Members of the Massachusetts Governor's Council
Democratic Party members of the Massachusetts House of Representatives
Bentley University alumni
Lowell Technological Institute alumni